Swingin' Stampede is the 1998 all-cover debut album of western swing group The Hot Club of Cowtown.

Track listing
"If I Had Someone Else" (Harris/Darcey/Stanley)  – 2:52
"Silver Dew on the Blue Grass Tonight" (Burt)  – 3:04
"Somebody Loves Me" (Gershwin)  – 2:10
"My Confession" (Wills)  – 3:00
"Snowflake Reel" (Traugutt)  – 2:01
"End of the Line" (Gimble/Wills)  – 2:53
"T and J Waltz" (Maddux)  – 2:53
"Sweet Jenny Lee" (Donaldson)  – 2:32
"Mission to Moscow" (Powell)  – 2:12
"You Can't Break My Heart" (Cooley/Rogers)  – 3:15
"Red Bird"  – 1:40
"Chinatown, My Chinatown" (Jerome/Schwartz)  – 3:00
"Just Friends" (Wills)  – 3:22
"Ida Red"  – 3:06

Personnel
Whit Smith - Vocals, Guitar, Producer
Elana Fremerman - Vocals, Fiddle, Producer
Billy Horton - Backup Vocals, Upright Bass, Producer
Johnny Gimble - Fiddle (Tracks 1, 4, 8, 14)
T Jarrod Bonta - Piano (Tracks 8, 10)
Jeremy Wakefield - Steel Guitar (Tracks 8, 10)
Mike Maddux - Accordion (Track 7)
Steve Starnes - Engineering
Spencer Starnes - Engineering
Ed Temple - Cover Illustration
George Brainard - Photography
Cindy Pascarello - Design

Reception

  	
Jim Smith, in his review of the album for AllMusic, said the group sounded "like a fired-up, pared down version of the Texas Playboys".

References

1998 debut albums
The Hot Club of Cowtown albums
Covers albums